The 8th Government of Azerbaijan is the current formation of the Cabinet of Azerbaijan.

Prime Minister 

 Novruz Mammadov (2018 to 2019)
 Ali Asadov (from 2019)

Deputy Prime Ministers 

 Yaqub Eyyubov
 Shahin Mustafayev
 Ali Ahmadov
 Hajibala Abutalybov
 Ali S. Hasanov

Other ministers 

 Vilayat Eyvazov - Minister of Internal Affairs
 Mukhtar Babayev - Minister of Ecology and Natural Resources
 Parviz Shahbazov - Minister of Energy
 Fikrat Mammadov - Minister of Justice
 Sahil Babayev - Minister of Labour and Social Protection of Population
 Kamaladdin Heydarov - Minister of Emergency Situations
 Farid Gayibov - Minister of Youth and Sports
 Mikayil Jabbarov - Minister of Economу
 Inam Karimov - Minister of Agriculture
 Samir Sharifov - Minister of Finance
 Anar Karimov - Minister of Culture
 Zakir Hasanov - Minister of Defence
 Madat Guliyev - Minister of Defence Industry
 Rashad Nabiyev - Minister of Transport, Communications and High Technologies
 Teymur Musayev - Minister of Healthcare
 Emin Amrullayev - Minister of Education
 Jeyhun Bayramov - Minister of Foreign Affairs

References

See also 

 Politics of Azerbaijan

Azerbaijani governments
Current governments
Cabinets established in 2018
2018 establishments in Azerbaijan